Scott Rose-Marsh (born 1988) is a British actor. He is known for his multiple appearances as Pete in S4C's Yr Amgueddfa, as Jerome in the BBC One series Chloe, among others.

Scott was educated at Woodlands Community College and The BRIT School.

Early life and career 
Born in 1988, in Southampton, England, Scott received his early education from Woodlands Community College. Later, he joined The BRIT School, London at the age of 16. In 2014, he started working for a call centre in Wales after moving to Blaenau Gwent. He lives in Ebbw Vale, Wales.

In 2020, he started his career as an actor after leaving his call centre job.

Scott has acted in numerous roles such as in S4C's Yr Amgueddfa, The Outlaws, Krays: Code of Silence, and others.

Selected filmography

Film

Television

References

External links 
 

1988 births
Living people
21st-century British male actors
Male actors from Southampton